Colleen is an Irish language name and is of Irish origin and a generic term for  women or girls, from the Irish cailín 'girl/woman', the diminutive of caile 'woman, countrywoman'.

Although it originates in the Irish language, Colleen as a given name is commonly used in the Republic of Ireland, but far more popular in Irish-descended communities in America, Britain and Australia. 

It may refer to:

People 
 Colleen Opoku Amuaben
 Colleen Atkinson
 Colleen Atwood (born 1948), American costume designer
 Colleen Ballinger (born 1986), American comedian, YouTube personality, and actress, known for her comedic character Miranda Sings
 Colleen Barrett (born 1944), president of Southwest Airlines in the US
 Colleen Barros
 Colleen Barry
 Colleen Beaumier
 Colleen Bell
 Colleen Bevis
 Colleen Bolton
 Colleen Brennan
 Colleen Broomall
 Colleen Brown
 Colleen Browning
 Colleen Burton
 Colleen Camp (born 1953), American actress and film producer
 Colleen V. Chien
 Colleen Clinkenbeard (born 1980), American voice actress and ADR director
 Colleen Dewhurst (1924–1991), Canadian-born actress
 Colleen Dion-Scotti (born 1964), American actress
 Colleen Doran (born 1963), American cartoonist, graphic novelist, writer and illustrator
 Colleen Egan
 Colleen Anne Fitzpatrick
 Colleen Fitzpatrick or Vitamin C (singer), American pop music artist, dancer and actress
 Colleen Garry
 Colleen Gleason, American science fiction and fantasy novelist
 Colleen Graffy
 Colleen Green
 Colleen Grondein
 Colleen Haskell (born 1976), American reality show contestant and actress
 Colleen A. Hoey, American diplomat
 Colleen Jones
 Colleen A. Kraft
 Colleen Lanne (born 1979), American freestyle swimmer
 Colleen Lee (born 1980), Hong Kong pianist
 Colleen B. Lemmon
 Colleen McCullough (1937–2015), Australian author
 Colleen McEdwards (born 1964), CNN International news anchor and correspondent, Ph.D. journalism professor and media researcher
 Colleen J. McElroy
 Colleen Mills (1955–2022), New Zealand management academic
 Colleen Moore (1899–1988), American film actress from the silent film era
 Colleen Nelson
 Colleen O'Shaughnessey (born 1971), American voice actress
 Colleen Quigley
 Colleen Rennison
 Colleen Rosensteel (born 1967), American judoka
 Colleen Thibaudeau (1925–2012), Canadian poet and short-story writer
 Colleen Waata Urlich
 Colleen Young (politician), Canadian provincial politician
 Colleen Young (swimmer), American swimmer
 Colleen Zenk (born 1953), American actress

Fictional characters 
 Colleen (Road Rovers), on the American animated TV series Road Rovers
 Colleen Carlton, on the American soap opera The Young and the Restless
 Colleen Caviello, on the American animated TV series Bob's Burgers
 Colleen Cooper, on the American TV series Dr. Quinn, Medicine Woman
 Colleen Donaghy, on the American TV comedy “30 Rock“
 Colleen Smart, on the Australian soap opera Home and Away
 Colleen Wing, a Marvel Comics superhero
 Colleen at Bel Ridge, Dina's nemesis on the American TV series Superstore

See also 
Coleen (disambiguation)

English feminine given names
Irish feminine given names
Irish-language feminine given names
Scottish feminine given names
Welsh feminine given names